Z-plan is a form of castle design common in England and Scotland.  The Z-plan castle has a strong central rectangular tower with smaller towers attached at diagonally opposite corners.

Prominent examples of the Z-plan include Brodie Castle in Moray, Castle Menzies in Perthshire,  Glenbuchat Castle in Aberdeenshire, Castle Fraser in Aberdeenshire, Claypotts Castle in Dundee and Hatton Castle, Angus, Scotland.

See also
L-plan castle

References

Castles by type